Treak Cliff Cavern is a show cave near Castleton in Derbyshire, England. It is part of the Castleton Site of Special Scientific Interest and one of only two sites where the ornamental mineral Blue John is still excavated (the other is the nearby Blue John Cavern). As part of an agreement with English Nature, the Blue John that can be seen in the show cave is not mined but it is extracted in small quantities from other areas of the cave and made into saleable items like bowls, jewellery, and ornaments.

The cave comprises two sections, the Old Series, discovered by lead miners in the 18th century, and the New Series, discovered during blasting in the 1920s. Only the Old Series contains Blue John, but the New Series is well decorated with flowstone, stalagmites, and stalactites. Three human skeletons and flint implements from the Neolithic era were found in a small cave nearby in 1921.

Geology

Treak Cliff, the hill in which the cavern lies, is composed of Carboniferous Limestone; the steep eastern slope of the hill is thought to have been the edge of a reef on the margin of a tropical lagoon. This reef was then raised above sea level by an uplift in the Earth's crust and was subsequently eroded, forming a boulder bed on the slopes. This was subsequently overlain by deltaic river sediments, which formed the shale and Millstone Grit sandstones that still overlay the limestone to the north, and on top of those the coal measures formed, until the limestone was deep beneath the surface and subject to high temperature and pressure. Major earth movements at the end of the Carboniferous period reversed this subsidence, and the rock layers were raised to form an anticline, the top of which was eroded away. Surface streams, on meeting the limestone, percolated through cracks and weaknesses and started to dissolve the limestone to form caverns. The stream that formed the New Series once flowed into the lower end of Winnats Pass, whereas the stream that formed the Old Series lost its headwaters to the predecessor of the modern Odin Sitch as it cut down through soft shales. There is no modern stream in the Treak Cliff Cavern, but percolating water from the cave has been dye-tested and found to emerge at the Russet Well beside Peakshole Water near Peak Cavern in Castleton, taking 13 to 20 hours to travel the distance.

Since their original formation, the caverns have been decorated by the formation of flowstone, stalagmites, and stalactites. Two stalagmite samples from the Aladdin's Cave section of the Treak Cliff Cavern have been found, by means of radioactive dating, to date back 111,000 years, proving that the cave itself is much older. The formations in Treak Cliff are stained orange or red by iron, white by lead, and occasionally green or blue by copper. Some of the stalactites have been distorted by variations in the flow to form twisted structures known as helictites.

Blue John

Trace elements from buried sediments, percolating rain water, and trapped sea water meant inorganic ions were present within the porous rock, among them chlorine, fluorine, sulfate, calcium, barium, lead, zinc, and even uranium. Organic material from the decomposing bodies of marine animals in the sediments formed hydrocarbons, precursors of oil and gas. At high pressure, a hot mineralised fluid formed and was forced into fractures and other voids in the rock. From this fluid, catalysed by the hydrocarbons, compounds such as galena (lead sulfide, PbS), sphalerite (zinc sulfide, ZnS), baryte (barium sulfate, BaSO4), and fluorspar (calcium fluoride, CaF2) were precipitated as solid crystals. At Treak Cliff the mineralised fluid was particularly rich in fluorine and 99% of the deposited mineral is fluorspar (technically, fluorite is the pure crystal and fluorspar the industrial name for the impure substance as mined). The exploitable deposits of fluorspar are known as "rakes", "scrins", "flats", or "pipes" depending on the size and shape of the voids in which the crystals were deposited.

At Treak Cliff and nearby Blue John Cavern, the fluorspar is uniquely banded, ranging from blue-black to white. The exact cause of the coloration is disputed, but it seems that the formation of Blue John requires a rare combination of porous limestone containing a little hydrocarbon, small traces of radioactive elements, an impervious layer to prevent the mineral fluids and hydrocarbons from escaping, a high concentration of fluorine ions, and variations in conditions during the crystallization process to form the banded colours. The rarity of this combination of conditions explains the scarcity of Blue John.

Because of its attractive banding and its rarity, Blue John has commercial value and ornaments made from it are much sought after by collectors. Historically, as well as from Treak Cliff and Blue John Cavern, veins of the mineral were also worked from Old Tor Mine and another mine in Winnats Pass, and also from mines near Windy Knoll and Odin Mine, toward Mam Tor. Limited opencast extraction of Blue John took place on the top of Treak Cliff during World War II, and an incident of unofficial and illegal extraction from Old Tor Mine in the 1970s led to that mine being closed by order of H.M. Inspector of Mines, leaving Treak Cliff and Blue John Cavern as the two remaining sources of new stocks of the mineral. Both caves have a policy of supplying raw Blue John only to shops within Castleton, so the few outlets selling it elsewhere rely on old stocks.

History
The Old Series is thought to have been discovered in about 1745–50 by miners seeking lead ore, and is known to have been a source of Blue John by the 1750s, at which time it was known as Millers Mine. Extraction continued throughout the 19th century, including some opencast working on the hilltop above. There is no historical evidence of the caves being shown to the public during this period, though the nearby Blue John Caverns were opened to the public in around 1800 and extended around 1843.

Demand for fluorspar increased during World War I and much ornamental Blue John was extracted for use as flux in blast furnaces and in the chemical industry. In 1921 miners discovered the remains of three human skeletons dated to the Neolithic period in a nearby cave close to the surface. A little later, in 1926, miners blasting with explosives discovered an extension to the natural cavern, a section well decorated with stalactites: the New Series.

Commercial mining ended shortly after 1926 but in the 1930s miners returning to retrieve stored Blue John discovered a new, easier route into the New Series. This encouraged the development of the cave as a tourist attraction and the landowner entrusted John Royse, whose father and grandfather had been agents for Blue John, to adapt it for public display. It opened to the public at Easter 1935. Named sections within the show cave include the Witch's Cave, the Fossil Cave, Aladdin's Cave, Fairyland, the Dream Cave, and the Dome of St Paul's. Some of the formations have also been given names, according to their perceived resemblance to other objects, such as the Stork, which forms part of the cavern's corporate logo, and the adjacent Ram's Head, both within the Dream Cave.

Lost Vein

In 1945, the management of the cavern was taken over by the Harrison family who still operate it. The outgoing tenant John Royse, who was close to retirement, reported he had discovered a significant and previously unknown source of Blue John in the cave. Royse intended to return with the 19-year-old Peter Harrison but died before he could describe the location. The lost vein, concealed by wooden battens, a piece of carpet, and a layer of clay, was rediscovered in 2013 by John Turner, Peter Harrison's grandson. At current rates of extraction, the find is expected to last for at least ten years. The discovery prompted a visit by the BBC's Countryfile programme later that year.

Ridley Vein
In 2015, another vein of Blue John was discovered close to the tourist route by a miner experimenting with a new method of exploration using a specialist chainsaw. The first new source for 150 years, it was named the Ridley Vein after its discoverer.

References

External links

 
 showcaves.com
 theheritagetrail.co.uk

Blue John (mineral)
Caves of Derbyshire
Fluorite mines
Limestone caves
Mines in Derbyshire
Show caves in the United Kingdom
Tourist attractions of the Peak District